The warm–hot intergalactic medium (WHIM) is the sparse, warm-to-hot (105 to 107 K) plasma that cosmologists believe to exist in the spaces between galaxies and to contain 40–50% of the baryonic 'normal matter' in the universe at the current epoch. The WHIM can be described as a web of hot, diffuse gas stretching between galaxies, and consists of plasma, as well as atoms and molecules, in contrast to dark matter. The WHIM is a proposed solution to the missing baryon problem, where the observed amount of baryonic matter does not match theoretical predictions from cosmology.

Much of what is known about the warmhot intergalactic medium comes from computer simulations of the cosmos. The WHIM is expected to form a filamentary structure of tenuous, highly ionized baryons with a density of 1−10 particles per cubic meter. Within the WHIM, gas shocks are created as a result of active galactic nuclei, along with the gravitationally-driven processes of merging and accretion. Part of the gravitational energy supplied by these effects is converted into thermal emissions of the matter by collisionless shock heating.

Because of the high temperature of the medium, the expectation is that it is most easily observed from the absorption or emission of ultraviolet and low energy X-ray radiation. To locate the WHIM, researchers examined X-ray observations of a rapidly growing supermassive black hole known as an active galactic nucleus, or AGN. Oxygen atoms in the WHIM were seen to absorb X-rays passing through the medium. In May 2010, a giant reservoir of WHIM was detected by the Chandra X-ray Observatory lying along the wall-shaped structure of galaxies (Sculptor Wall) some 400 million light-years from Earth. In 2018, observations of highly-ionized extragalactic oxygen atoms appeared to confirm simulations of the WHIM mass distribution. Observations for dispersion from fast radio bursts in 2020, further appeared to confirm the missing baryonic mass to be located at the WHIM.

Circumgalactic medium
Conceptually similar to WHIM, circumgalactic medium (CGM) is a halo of gas surrounding galaxies that is diffuse, and nearly invisible.  Current thinking is that the CGM is an important source of star-forming material, and that it regulates a galaxy’s gas supply. If visible, the CGM of the Andromeda Galaxy (1.3-2 million ly) would stretch 3 times the size of the width of the Big Dipper—easily the biggest feature on the nighttime sky, and even bump into our own CGM, though that isn't fully known because we reside in it.  There are two layered parts to Andromeda CGM: an inner shell of gas is nested inside an outer shell. The inner shell (0.5 million ly) is more dynamic and is thought to be more dynamic and turbulent because of outflows from supernova, and the outer shell is hotter and smoother.

See also

 Intergalactic space
 Intracluster medium

References

Intergalactic media